Khkem is a rural locality (a selo) in Akhtynsky Selsoviet, Akhtynsky District, Republic of Dagestan, Russia. The population was 406 as of 2010. There are 8 streets.

Geography
Khkem is located 4 km northeast of Akhty (the district's administrative centre) by road. Akhty is the nearest rural locality.

References 

Rural localities in Akhtynsky District